Reinhold Hoffmann (9 August 1921 – 24 May 1944) was a Luftwaffe ace and recipient of the Knight's Cross of the Iron Cross during World War II.  The Knight's Cross of the Iron Cross was awarded to recognise extreme battlefield bravery or successful military leadership.  On 24 May 1944, Reinhold Hoffmann attempted an emergency landing at Friesack following aerial combat. His Fw-190 crashed, killing him instantly.  He was posthumously awarded the Knight's Cross on 28 January 1945.  During his career he was credited with 67 aerial victories, 3 on the Western Front and 64 on the Eastern Front.

Summary of career

Aerial victory claims
According to US historian David T. Zabecki, Hoffmann was credited with 66 aerial victories.

Awards
 Aviator badge
 Front Flying Clasp of the Luftwaffe
 Ehrenpokal der Luftwaffe (29 September 1943)
 Iron Cross (1939)
 2nd Class
 1st Class
 German Cross in Gold on 14 November 1943 as Feldwebel in the II./Jagdgeschwader 54
 Knight's Cross of the Iron Cross on 28 January 1945 as Leutnant and pilot in the 6./Jagdgeschwader 54

Notes

References

Citations

Bibliography

External links
 Aces of the Luftwaffe
 TracesOfWar.com

1921 births
1944 deaths
Luftwaffe personnel killed in World War II
German World War II flying aces
Luftwaffe pilots
People from Jelenia Góra
People from the Province of Lower Silesia
Recipients of the Gold German Cross
Recipients of the Knight's Cross of the Iron Cross
Aviators killed in aviation accidents or incidents in Germany